The Afghanistan cricket team is scheduled to tour Bangladesh in June and July 2023 to play two Test, three One Day International (ODI) and three Twenty20 International (T20I) matches. The International Cricket Council (ICC) confirmed this FTP tour in their press release.

References

2023 in Bangladeshi cricket
2023 in Afghan cricket
International cricket competitions in 2023
Afghan cricket tours of Bangladesh